Ajaz Khan is an Indian actor. He has starred in movies such as Rakta Charitra and Allah Ke Banday and acted in several television daily soaps including Rahe Tera Aashirwaad and Kahaani Hamaaray Mahaabhaarat Ki. In 2013, Khan participated in Bigg Boss 7. He also appeared on the TV show Comedy Nights with Kapil.

His other films include Lakeer ka Fakeer and the Indian films Dookudu and Naayak. He has appeared in an Academy Awards promotion commercial.

Khan was in a music video 'Pal Pal' along with Saher Afsha released by Tseries on 26 September 2020.

Early life
Khan was born in Ahmedabad, India.

Career

2003–2009: Acting debut in television
Khan started his career with acting in the film Patth which released in 2003. Later he made his television career debut with Ekta Kapoor's Kyaa Hoga Nimmo Kaa in 2007. Later in 2008, Khan participated in the reality show Bollywood Club where he emerged as the winner. Later he appeared in shows like Rahe Tera Aashirwaad as Tej, Kahaani Hamaaray Mahaabhaarat Ki as Dushasan, Karam Apnaa Apnaa as Arjun.

2009–2012: Entry in Bollywood
In 2009, Khan appeared in the film Ek... The Power of One. In 2010, appeared in Shyam Ramsay's Bachao - Inside Bhoot Hai.... He then appeared in Rahul Dholakia's Lamhaa playing the role of Kuka Pare which released in July 2010. This followed appearing in Faruk Kabir's Allah Ke Banday playing the role of Nana Chauhan, however the film did not do well in the box office and was declared a disaster. He later appeared in films like Rakta Charitra 2 and Tequila Nights.

In 2011, he made his Telugu film debut with Srinu Vaitla's Dookudu co-starring Mahesh Babu which released in September 2011. He then appeared in Bbuddah... Hoga Terra Baap which was a disaster at the box office. In 2012, he appeared in the film The World of Fashion.

2013–present: Bigg Boss 7 and further success
In 2013, he appeared in the film Lakeer ka Fakeer directed by Zubair Khan. Later he appeared in three Telugu films Naayak and Badshah.

In November 2013, Khan participated in the seventh season of the Indian version of the reality TV show Big Brother, Bigg Boss. He entered as a wild card contestant who survived until the end where he emerged as a finalist.

In April 2014, he participated in Colors TV's stunt reality show, Fear Factor: Khatron Ke Khiladi 5 as a wild card contestant. He later appeared on Comedy Nights with Kapil. In December 2014, he participated in Sony TV's cricket reality show Box Cricket League in its first season appearing in Sara Khan's team. Later he entered Bigg Boss 8 where he was introduced as the first challenger. He later got ejected from the house after his fight with Ali Quli Mirza in Bigg Boss Halla Bol!.

He appeared in films like Heart Attack Ya Rab Veta (2014) & Temper (2015). In 2016, he appeared in Love Day - Pyaar Ka Din and played the role of Monty. In 2020 he appeared in the film Gul Makai.

Personal life 

Khan is married to Andrea Khan. They both have one son, Alexander Khan.

Filmography

Television

Films
 Denotes films that have not yet been released

Upcoming

See also
List of Indian film actors

References

External links

 
 

Living people
21st-century Indian male actors
Indian male film actors
Male actors in Hindi cinema
Male actors in Telugu cinema
Indian male television actors
Male actors from Ahmedabad
Male actors in Kannada cinema
Male actors in Hindi television
1981 births
Bigg Boss (Hindi TV series) contestants
Fear Factor: Khatron Ke Khiladi participants